Tocov (German: Totzau) is an abandoned Sudeten German settlement located in the Hradiště military training area four kilometers southeast of Stráž nad Ohří. It lies in the Doupov Mountains at an altitude of 590 m on the Petrovský creek.

History 
The village was first mentioned in 1369 and became independent in 1850; till then it belonged to the town Doupov (German: Duppau). The village was inhabited mainly by Germans, who were expulsed after World War II. In an incident in May 1945 31 Germans were killed in retaliation for the killing of a policeman and the injuring of another who searched for allegedly hidden Nazis from the district centre of Kaaden.

Demography

References 

Former villages in the Czech Republic
Villages in Karlovy Vary District
Former populated places in the Czech Republic